Mirrors for princes or mirrors of princes are an educational literary genre, in a loose sense of the word, of political writings during the Early Middle Ages, the High Middle Ages, the late middle ages and the Renaissance. They are part of the broader speculum or mirror literature genre. 

The term itself is medieval, as it appears as early as the 12th century, under the words speculum regum, and may have been used earlier than that. The genre concept may have come from the popular speculum literature that was popular between the 12th through 16th centuries, which focused on knowledge of a particular subject matter.

These texts most frequently take the form of textbooks which directly instruct kings, princes or lesser rulers on certain aspects of governance and behaviour. But in a broader sense the term is also used to cover histories or literary works aimed at creating images of kings for imitation or avoidance. Authors often composed such "mirrors" at the accession of a new king, when a young and inexperienced ruler was about to come to power. One could view them as a species of prototypical self-help book or study of leadership before the concept of a "leader" became more generalised than the concept of a monarchical head-of-state.

One of the earliest works was written by Sedulius Scottus ( 840–860), the Irish poet associated with the Pangur Bán gloss poem ( 9th century). Possibly the best known European "mirror" is The Prince ( 1513) by Niccolo Machiavelli, although this was not the most typical example.

Antiquity

Sumeria 

 Instructions of Shuruppak (Early 3rd millennium BC)

Egypt

Ptahhotep, The Maxims of Ptahhotep (2375-2350BC)
Kheti III, Teaching for King Merykara (c. 2150BC)
Kheti the Scribe, Instructions of Amenemhat (c. 1971BC), a guide-poem  on kingship for Senusret I, the son of the former Pharaoh Amenemhat I.
Amenemope, Son of Kanakht, Instruction of Amenemope (c. 1100BC)

Greek and Roman
Plato, Republic (375BC)
Xenophon, The Education of Cyrus (c. 370BC)
Aristotle, Politics (c. Mid 4th century BC)
Isocrates, To Nicocles and Evagoras
Philodemus, The Good King According to Homer
Dio Chrysostom, The First Discourse on Kingship and The Second Discourse on Kingship and The Third Discourse on Kingship and The Fourth Discourse on Kingship
Cicero, De Officiis (44BC)
Seneca, De Clementia (55-56AD)
Plutarch, Moralia (c.100AD)
Pliny the Younger, Panegyric of Trajan (100AD)
Eusebius of Caesarea's Life of Constantine may be a mirror for princes.  This text's precise genre, audience, and aims has been a subject of scholarly controversy. (c. 339AD)
Ambrose, De officiis ministrorum (c. 391AD) although the book is for clergy, many of its lessons can be applied to secular lords due to its inspiration and criticism of Cicero's original.
 Augustine of Hippo, The City of God, Book V, chapter 24, "The true felicity of Christian Emperors." (c.413-426AD)
 Salvian, De gubernatione Dei (439-451AD)

Indian
Vishnu Sharma, Panchatantra (Between 200 BC - 300AD)
Chanakya, Arthashastra (Between 200BC - 300AD)
Narayan Pandit, Hitopdesha (c. 770 - 860AD)
Chhatrapati Sambhaji Maharaj, "Budhbhushan" (c. 1670 - 1680AD)

Western European texts

Early Middle Ages
Pope Gregory the Great, The Book of Pastoral Rule (590AD) Although dedicated to clergy, lessons may also apply to nobles.
 Gregory of Tours' History of the Franks (late 6th century) which warns against internal strife.
De duodecim abusivis saeculi, 'On the twelve abuses of the world' (7th century), a Hiberno-Latin treatise by an anonymous Irish author sometimes referred to as Pseudo-Cyprian. This work, though not a 'mirror for princes' per se, was to be of great influence on the development of the 'genre' as it took place on the Continent.
 Bede's Ecclesiastical History of the English People (731AD) specifically states that the purpose of the study of history is to present examples for either imitation or avoidance.

Carolingian texts. Notable examples of Carolingian textbooks for kings, counts and other laymen include:
Cathwulf, Epistolae (775) written for Charlemagne.
Paulinus of Aquileia, Liber exhortationis (795), for Count Heiric of Friuli.
Alcuin, De virtutibus et vitiis (c. 799–800), written for Count Wido of Brittany.
Smaragdus of Saint-Mihiel, Via regia (813), arguably the first true European mirror for princes, dedicated to Louis the Pious, when king of Aquitania.
 Einhard's Vita Karoli Magni (c. 814) which idolises Charlemagne's reign as something for other rulers to aspire to.
Jonas of Orléans, De Institutione Laicali (818-828), (originally) written for Count Matfrid of Orléans.
Jonas of Orléans, De Institutione Regia (c. 831), written for Pepin I of Aquitaine, apparently on the basis of a council at Orléans.
Dhuoda, (841-843) Liber manualis, written for her son William.
Agobard of Lyons, his letters, A Comparison of Ecclesiastical and Political Government and Wherein the Dignity of the Church Outshines the Majesty of Empires and the Liber Apologeticus.
Sedulius Scottus, De rectoribus christianis 'On Christian rulers' (c. 855-9), addressed to King Lothar II of Lotharingia.
Hincmar of Reims, De regis persona 'The Person of the King'
Hincmar of Reims, De ordine palatii 'On the management of the palace' (882), which sets out the moral duties of a king and includes an account of the organisation of the palace.

Irish texts
see De duodecim abusivis saeculi above. The vernacular mirrors differ from most texts mentioned here in that the ones who are described as giving and receiving advice are commonly legendary figures.
Audacht Morainn ('The Testament of Morand'), written c. 700, an Old Irish text which has been called a forerunner of the 'mirrors for princes'. The legendary wise judge Morand is said to have sent advice to Feradach Find Fechtnach when the latter was about to be made King of Tara.
Tecosca Cormaic, 'The Instructions of Cormac', in which the speaker Cormac mac Airt is made to instruct his son Cairbre Lifechair about a variety of matters.
Bríatharthecosc Con Culainn 'The precept-instruction of Cúchulainn' (interpolated in Serglige Con Culainn), addressed to Lugaid Réoderg.
Tecosc Cuscraid 'The instruction of Cuscraid'
Senbríathra Fithail 'The ancient precepts of Fíthal'
Briathra Flainn Fína 'The Sayings of Flann Fína'

High Middle Ages
Stephen I of Hungary, Admonitions (1010s), written for his son and heir presumptive Saint Emeric.
John of Salisbury, Policraticus = 'The Statesman's Book' (1159).
Godfrey of Viterbo, Speculum regum (c. 1183), dedicated to his Staufian imperial patrons, father Frederick Barbarossa and son Henry VI.
Pseudo-Plutarch, Institutio Traiani (first quoted in John of Salisbury's Policraticus).
Gerald of Wales, De instructione principis (c. 1193)
Jean de Limoges, Somnium morale Pharaonis (c. 1234-60), written for Thibaut IV or Thibaut V
Konungs skuggsjá or Speculum regale, (c. 1250) Norwegian treatise originally written for King Magnús lagabœtir.
Vincent of Beauvais, De eruditione filiorum nobilium = 'On the Education of Noble Children' (c. 1250).
Guibert of Tournai, Eruditio regum et principum = '''The Education of Kings and Princes' (1259), written for Louis IX.
Guibert of Tournai, De modo addiscendi = 'On the Method of Learning' (c. 1260) written for John de Dampierre, provost of Bruges, son of Guy of Flanders.
Thomas Aquinas, De regno (c. 1260), often conflated with the De regimine principum of Ptolemy of Lucca
Vincent de Beauvais, De morali principis institutione = 'On the Moral Instruction of the Prince' (c. 1262), probably written for Louis IX.
William Peraldus, De eruditione principum = 'On the Education of Princes' (c. 1265), formerly attributed to Thomas Aquinas.
Brunetto Latini, Li livres dou trésor (1266), written for Charles of Anjou.
Giles of Rome, De regimine principum = 'On the Rule of Princes' (c. 1278), written for Philip the Fair.

Late Middle Ages
Engelbert of Admont, Speculum virtutum moralium (c. 1310), written for Otto, Duke of Austria and Albert II, Duke of Austria
Paolino Veneto, Trattato de regimine rectoris (1313×1315), written for the Marino Badoer, duke of Crete
William of Pagula, Speculum regis, written for Edward III of England (c. 1331).
Don Juan Manuel, Tales of Count Lucanor (1335).
Alvarus Pelagius, Speculum regum (1340s), written for Alfonso XI of Castile.Um styrilsi kununga ok höfþinga (1350s), Old Swedish treatiseThe III Consideracions Right Necesserye to the Good Governaunce of a Prince (c. 1350),  a translation of a French treatise from 1347, intended for King John II of France.
Philip of Leyden, De cura reipublicae et sorte principantis ("On the care of the state and the role of the ruler") (c. 1355), dedicated to William V of Holland
Evrart de Trémaugon, Le songe du verger (1376).Der Fürsten reget, (c. 1370-1380) dedicated to William, Duke of Austria
Christine de Pizan, Epistre Othea a Hector (c. 1400), Livre du corps de policie (1407), Livre de la paix (between 1412 and 1414).
Pierre Salmon, Dialogues (1409, rev. 1412/15), dedicated to Charles VI of France
Thomas Hoccleve, De regimine principum (early 1410s) written for Henry V of England.
Duarte of Portugal, Leal Conselheiro (1438), a practical manual of ethical guidance for the nobility of Portugal.
John Ireland, The Meroure of Wysedome, (1490) written for James IV of Scotland.
Phillipus de Bergamo, Spiegel der regyrunge (15th century) translated into middle GermanEyn kurz ordenunge in gemeyne allen den die da regieren huß, dorffere oder stede, (15th century) short text written on how to rule a household, village or cityVon der regeronge der stede, (15th century) text written on how to govern a city

Renaissance
John Skelton, Speculum principis (1501), lost work written for the then future Henry VIII. A copy of this treatise, which may not be entirely the same as that presented to Henry, resides with the British Museum.
Erasmus, Institutio principis Christiani 'Education of a Christian Prince' (1516), written as advice to King Charles of Spain (the later Charles V).
Martin Luther. On Secular Authority (1523), a letter dedicated to John, Elector of Saxony
Baldassare Castiglione's The Book of the Courtier (1528), based on experiences of the courts of Urbino.
Antonio de Guevara, Relox de príncipes (1529), inspired by and dedicated to Charles V, a bestseller of its times, translated during the 16th Century to English, Latin, Italian, German, French and Dutch.
Justus Menius, Oeconomia christiana (1529), dedicated to Sibylle of Cleves for a right ordering of a Christian Lutheran household
Machiavelli, Il Principe (c. 1513, published in 1532).
George Buchanan, De iure regni apud Scotos (1579), a work in the form of a Socratic dialogue on ideal kingship dedicated to the young James VI of Scotland
Giovanni Botero, The Reason of State (1589), a criticism of Machiavelli's Prince. 
Johann Damgaard, Alithia (1597), written for the young Danish monarch King Christian IV.
Juan de Mariana, De rege et regis institutione (Toledo, 1598); The King and the Education of the KingJames VI of Scotland, Basilikon Doron (1599) written as a gift to his eldest son.
Francisco de Quevedo, La política de Dios, y gobierno de Cristo (1617–1626) The Politics of God and the Government of ChristHugo Grotius, De jure belli ac pacis (1625) dedicated to Louis XIII of France
John Gauden, Eikon Basilike (1649) published after Charles I of England was beheaded.

Enlightenment
John Locke, Some Thoughts Concerning Education (1693AD)
Jacques-Bénigne Bossuet, Politics Drawn from the Very Words of Holy Scripture (1709AD) dedicated to the future Louis XV of France.
Frederick II of Prussia, Anti-Machiavel (1740AD) a critique of Machiavelli's Prince.
Frederick II of Prussia, Letter addressed to his nephew, Charles Eugene, Duke of Württemberg (6 February 1744AD) 
Montesquieu, The Spirit of Law (1748AD)

Modern
Walter Bagehot, The English Constitution (1867) studied by generations of British monarchs for its insight on their role in a constitutional monarchy.

Byzantine texts

Synesius, Bishop of Cyrene, De regno, speech delivered to emperor Arcadius.
Agapetus the deacon, speech delivered to emperor Justinian I. (c. 530s)
Basil I the Macedonian, Admonitory chapters I and II to his son emperor Leo VI the Wise
Constantine VII Porphyrogennetos, De Administrando Imperio, a domestic and foreign policy manual for the use of Constantine's son and successor, the Emperor Romanos II. (948 - 952)
Kekaumenos, Strategikon (1075/1078), chapters 77 - 91.
Archbishop Theophylact of Ohrid, Paideia Basilike (Lat. Institutio Regia) (c. 1088), addressed to his pupil Constantine Doukas, son of Emperor Michael VII Doukas.Spaneas or Didaskalia Parainetike, modelled on the Isocratean Ad Demonicum (12th century)
Nikephoros Blemmydes, Andrias Basilikos (Lat. Regia statua, "Statue of a King"), written for Theodore II Laskaris, the future Nicaean emperor (c. 1250)
Thomas Magistros, La  addressed to Andronikos II Palaiologos. (14th century)
Manuel II Palaiologos, Paideia Regia dedicated to his son, John VIII Palaiologos. (15th century)

Pre-Islamic Persian texts
Ewen-Nāmag (“Book of Rules”): On the Sasanian manners, customs, skills, and arts, sciences, etc. (Between 3rd - 7th century AD)
Andarz literature. (Between 3rd - 7th century AD)

Islamic texts

Abd al-Hamid al-Katib, letter to Abdallah son of the Umayyad caliph Marwan II (c. 750)
Ibn al-Muqaffa, Kalila wa Dimna (c. 750)
 Abu Yahya ibn al-Batriq (d. 815) Sirr al-Asrar 'Secretum Secretorum'
Al-Farabi (c. 872–950), Fusul al-Madani 'Aphorisms of a Statesman'
Abu'l-Qasim al-Husayn ibn Ali al-Maghribi (981–1027), Kitab fi'l-si'yasa Al-Tha'alibi (d. 1038), Ādāb al-mulūkAl-Mubashshir ibn Fatik (fl.1053, Damascus), Mukhtār al-Hikam wa-Maḥāsin al-Kalim 'Selected Maxims and Aphorisms'Qabus nama (1082) – a Persian example of the genre
Nizam al-Mulk, Siyāset-nāmeh 'Book of Government' (c. 1090) (Persian)
Al-Imam al-Hadrami (d. 1095) -  Kitâb al-IshâraAl-Ghazali (1058–1111), Nasihat al-muluk 'Counsel to Princes' (Persian)
Yusuf Balasaghuni, Kutadgu Bilig (11th century)
At-Turtushi, Siraj al-Muluk 'The Lamp of Kings' (c. 1121)
Ibn Ẓafar al-Ṣiqillī's (12th century) Sulwan al-Muta' fi 'udwan al-atba 'Consolation for the Ruler during the Hostility of Subjects'; published in English (1852) as, Solwān; or Waters Of ComfortMichele Amari (1852) Solwān; or Waters Of Comfort by Ibn Zafer, vol.2Bahr Al-Fava'id 'Sea of (Precious) Virtues', compiled in the 12th century.
Ibn Arabi, Divine Governance of the Human Kingdom (At-Tadbidrat al-ilahiyyah fi islah al-mamlakat al-insaniyyah) (1194-1201AD/590-598AH)
Saadi's Gulistan, chapter I, "The Manners of Kings", (1258, Persian).
Hussain Vaiz Kashifi's Aklhaq i Muhsini (composed in Persian AH 900/AD 1495), translated into English as "The Morals Of The Beneficent" in the mid 19th century by Henry George Keene
Lütfi Pasha Asafname (Mid-16th century)
Muhammad al-Baqir Najm-I Sani, Mau‘izah-i Jahangiri 'Admonition of Jahāngír' or 'Advice on the art of governance' (1612 - 1613).

Slavonic texts
Patriarch Photios I of Constantinople, letter addressed to Boris I of Bulgaria (867AD)
Poucheniye (Instruction) of Vladmir Monomakh to his children (1120s).
Izmaragd (c. 14th century) moral guide and education for children
Patriarch Antony IV of Constantinople, letter to Vasily I of Moscow (1393).
Domostroy (c. 15th century)
Neagoe Basarab (1512–1521), The teachings of Neagoe Basarab to his son Theodosie, one of the earliest literary works in Wallachia
Mikhail Lomonosov, (1760) Panegyric to the Sovereign Emperor, Peter the GreatChinese texts
Ancient
 Tao Te Ching – Lao Tzu Chinese philosopher (Can be interpreted as a mystical text, philosophical text, or political treatise on rulership) (late 4th century BC)
 Mencius – moral advice for a ruler (late 4th century BC)
 Han Fei Zi – Legalist text advice for a ruler and the art of statecraft (mid-3rd century BC) dedicated to Qin Shi Huang
 The Book of Lord Shang (Multiple authors spanning centuries, starting from c. 330BC) text advice useful for a ruler and statecraft
 Shizi (c. 330BC) particularly section 15, The Ruler's GovernanceImperial Dynasties
Han Dynasty
Lu Jia (c.200BC) Xin Yu 新语 ("New Discourses"), treatise on why empires rise and fall.
Ban Biao (c.50AD) Book of Han, Volume 23, Treatise on Punishment and Law
Ban Biao (c.50AD) Treatise on the Mandate of Kings (王命論) covers the concept of sovereignty that would influence later Chinese texts.

Tang Dynasty
Ouyang Xun (624AD) Yiwen leiju 藝文類聚 ("Classified collection based on the Classics and other literature")
Kong Yingda (642AD) Wujing Zhengyi 五經正義 ("Correct Meaning of the Five Classics")
Liu Zhi (7th century AD) Zhengdian 政典 ("Manual of politics"), a political encyclopaedia useful for young boys taking the Imperial Examination

Song Dynasty
Ouyang Xiu (1060AD) New Book of Tang, carries a treatise on how to select and appoint officials.
Sima Guang (1084AD) Zizhi Tongjian (Comprehensive Mirror in Aid of Governance)
Zhu Xi (1172AD) Zizhi Tongjian Gangmu
Zheng Qiao (12th century) Tongzhi 通治 ("Comprehensive Treatise on Government")

Ming Dynasty
Zhu Yuanzhang (1373AD) Huang-Ming ZuxunQing Dynasty
Huang Zongxi (1661-62AD) Waiting for the DawnIn popular culture
 Mirrors For Princes is the name of a 2010 cinematic work by Lior Shamriz. Parts of the text were based on the Instructions of Shuruppak and other Sumerian literature.

See also

 Conduct book
 Ensenhamen (Occitan)
 Nasîhatnâme
 Phronesis
 Speculum literature
 Teaching stories
 Wisdom literature

References

Further reading

Anton, H.H. Fürstenspiegel und Herrscherethos in der Karolingerzeit. Bonner Historische Forschungen 32. Bonn, 1968.
Anton, H.H. "Fürstenspiegel (Königsspiegel) des frühen und hohen Mittelalters: Ein Editionsprojekt an der Universität Trier"
Finotti, Fabio (ed.), "I volti del principe". Venezia: Marsilio, 2018.
Handy, Amber. "The Specula principum in northwestern Europe, A.D. 650-900 : the evolution of a new ethical rule". Thesis (Ph. D.)--University of Notre Dame, 2011. Notre Dame, Ind. : University of Notre Dame, 2011. Retrieved May 17, 2015. Univ. of Notre Dame Online theses & dissertations
Konstantinos D.S. Paidas, He thematike ton byzantinon "katoptron hegemonos" tes proimes kai meses Byzantines periodoy(398-1085). Symbole sten politike theoria ton Byzantinon, Athens 2005.
Konstantinos D.S. Paidas, Ta byzantina "katoptra hegemonos" tes ysteres periodoy (1254–1403). Ekfraseis toy byzantinoy basilikou ideodous, Athens 2006.
Lambton, Ann K.S. "Islamic Mirrors for Princes." In: eadem, Theory and Practice in Medieval Persian Government. London. 1980. VI: 419–442.
Smith, Roland M. "The Speculum Principum in Early Irish Literature." Speculum'' 2 (1927): 411–45.

 
Medieval literature
Renaissance literature
Wisdom literature